Frank W. Angell (1851–1943) was an American architect practicing in Providence, Rhode Island.

Life and career
Frank Wilson Angell was born May 7, 1851, in Providence, Rhode Island, to Avery F. Angell, a dentist, and Cynthia (Day) Angell. He trained as a carpenter, but in 1872 he entered the office of Providence architects Walker & Gould as a draftsman.

By 1880, he had become a prominent designer and was permitted by the partners to take his own commissions. In January 1881, he and Thomas J. Gould left the firm, which would become William R. Walker & Son. The two formed a new partnership, Gould & Angell. In 1893 they added designer Frank H. Swift to the partnership, which became Gould, Angell & Swift. Gould retired from the firm in 1897, and began practicing alone. Angell & Swift continued in practice until 1934, Swift's death. Afterwards, Angell entered semi-retirement, taking occasional work at an office in his Pawtuxet home. Upon his death, Angell was Rhode Island's oldest architect.

Frank W. Angell was related to Providence and New York architect Edward L. Angell.

Architectural Works

Gould & Angell, 1881-1893

Gould, Angell & Swift, 1893-1897

Angell & Swift, 1897-1934

References

1851 births
1943 deaths
19th-century American architects
Architects from Providence, Rhode Island
20th-century American architects